What If We Were Real is the fourth studio album by CCM singer Mandisa. The album was released on April 5, 2011 on Sparrow Records.  This album received a nomination at 54th Grammy Awards for Best Contemporary Christian Music Album.

Background 

Mandisa began work on the album in July 2010. She also co-wrote three songs on the album. The album also features a guest appearance from tobyMac on the song "Good Morning".

Singles 

The first single off of the album was "Stronger". It peaked at number one on the Hot Christian Songs chart and as of August 31, 2011, has sold 194,000 copies.

"Waiting for Tomorrow" was the second single and peaked at number nine on the Hot Christian AC chart.

"Good Morning" featuring Christian artist TobyMac was the third single. It sold 138,000 copies. On October 11, 2014 it has been certified Gold by RIAA.

Track listing

Commercial performance
The album sold 8,000 copies, debuting at No. 66 on the Billboard 200 albums chart and at number two on the Christian Albums chart. The album debuted with higher sales and peaked in better chart positions than her previous album, Freedom. It has sold a total of 196,000 copies as of August 2012.

Charts

Weekly charts

Year-end charts

References 

2011 albums
Mandisa albums
Sparrow Records albums